New South Wales v Commonwealth may refer to a number of High Court of Australia cases:
 New South Wales v Commonwealth (1908) 7 CLR 179
 New South Wales v Commonwealth (1915) 20 CLR 54, Wheat Case
 New South Wales v Commonwealth (1932) 46 CLR 155, Garnishee Case No 1
 New South Wales v Commonwealth (1975) 135 CLR 337, Seas and Submerged Lands Case
 New South Wales v Commonwealth (1983) 151 CLR 302, Hospital Benefits Fund Case
 New South Wales v Commonwealth (1990) 169 CLR 482, Incorporation Case
 New South Wales v Commonwealth (2006), WorkChoices Case

High Court of Australia cases
Australian constitutional law